Frederick William Grant (1834–1902) was a Brethren biblical scholar, renowned for his studies in the structural and numerical form and content.

Biography
F. W. Grant was born on 25 July 1834 in the Putney area of London. Educated at King's College School, London in the hope of eventual employment in the British War Office, when this course failed, he emigrated to Canada, initially joining and being ordained into the Anglican Church there. He moved again to the US and New York, finding a final home in New Jersey. He became associated with a group of exclusive brethren which eventually became known as the Grant  fellowship.

He published numerous books based on his scriptural studies and in 1880 "Help and Food" a monthly magazine was launched and edited by Grant until his death.

He died in Plainfield, New Jersey on the 25th July 1902 which coincidentally was his 68 birthday. An Obituary in Help and Food (September 1902) records F. W. Grant's death on Friday, July 25, 1902, and his burial "on Lord’s Day, his sixty-eight birthday." Though technically the magazine was incorrect as his burial on Sunday was two days after his birthday.

Works

 [1890-1904]
Vol. 1: Genesis to Deuteronomy
Vol. 2: Joshua to 2 Samuel
Vol. 3: Psalms
Vol. 4: Ezekiel
Vol. 5: Matthew to John
Vol. 6: Acts to 2 Corinthians
Vol. 7: Hebrews to Revelation

 Leaves From the Book 
 Atonement: In Type, Prophecy, and Accomplishment
 The Crowned Christ
 Lessons of the Ages
 The Prophetic History of the Church
 Spiritual Law in the Natural World
 Lessons from Exodus
 Deliverance
 Peter's Conversion
 The Two Natures
 The Sovereignty of God in Salvation
 Nicolaitanism: The Rise and Growth of the Clergy

References

Bibliography

External links
F.W. Grant's bio

British biblical scholars
1834 births
1902 deaths
Christian fundamentalists
People from Putney
American Plymouth Brethren
Editors of Christian publications
British emigrants to Canada
Canadian emigrants to the United States
Bible commentators